Tritia pellucida, common name : the cyclops nassa, is a species of sea snail, a marine gastropod mollusk in the family Nassariidae, the Nassa mud snails or dog whelks.

Even as Cyclope has been ruled to have a feminine gender by Opinion 793 of the ICZN, Risso published the name as masculine Cyclope pellucidus and the synonym  Cyclope donovania as feminine.

Description
The shell size varies between 5 mm and 12 mm

Distribution
This species occurs in the Mediterranean Sea (Greece)

References

 Costa O.G. (1840). Fauna Siciliana. Fasc. 1. Molluschi. 4 pp
 Cernohorsky W. O. (1984). Systematics of the Family Nassariidae (Mollusca: Gastropoda). Bulletin of the Auckland Institute and Museum 14: 1–356
 Gofas, S.; Le Renard, J.; Bouchet, P. (2001). Mollusca, in: Costello, M.J. et al. (Ed.) (2001). European register of marine species: a check-list of the marine species in Europe and a bibliography of guides to their identification. Collection Patrimoines Naturels, 50: pp. 180–213

External links
 
 Risso, A. (1827). Histoire Naturelle des Principales Productions de l'Europe Méridionale et Particulièrement de Celles des Environs de Nice et des Alpes Maritimes. Tome V. Paris: F.-G. Levrault. i-viii + 1-403 pp.
 Galindo, L. A.; Puillandre, N.; Utge, J.; Lozouet, P.; Bouchet, P. (2016). The phylogeny and systematics of the Nassariidae revisited (Gastropoda, Buccinoidea). Molecular Phylogenetics and Evolution. 99: 337-353

pellucida
Gastropods described in 1826